The Birmingham Roller is a breed of domesticated roller pigeon that originated in Birmingham, England. They were developed via selective breeding, for their ability to do rapid backward somersaults while flying.

Rolling motion 

It is unknown why the Birmingham Roller and other roller pigeons tumble. While it is true that the birds do perform backward somersaults in flight, the exact neurological causes of the rolling behaviour are still unknown.

This bird has a genetic inclination to flip backwards, provided adequate training, diet, and exercise. The spinning can appear to be so fast that the bird looks like a ball of feathers falling toward the ground. They recover from the spin and return to their flock, called a "kit" in competition. The pigeon continues to do the same acrobatics with regular frequency, often in unison with other birds in the kit. The frequency, depth, style, tightness of roll, and angle are all determined by careful and methodical breeding. The flight time, height of flight, and responsiveness to the trainer's commands are all determined by strict training and diet, along with consistent daily routine.

A noted pigeon fancier, William Pensom described the motion thus:

There have been more recent scientific studies of roller pigeons, including the mode of inheritance and a high-speed video analysis of the specific movements involved in rolling and tumbling in pigeons. In brief, rolling and tumbling in flight or on the ground are genetically the same phenomenon, but differ in duration, and hence, the length of the tumble or roll. The most extreme example of rolling in flight is a "roll-down", in which case a bird will somersault to the ground from any height and, on the ground, the parlor roller, which cannot fly at all, and somersaults backward (or rolls) every time it tries to fly.

The specific cause of the rolling phenomenon has not yet been determined, but the high-speed video analysis of parlor rollers in motion shows that their head goes backwards and their tail upwards when they raise their wings, the exact opposite of what a normal pigeon would do in attempting to fly.

Similar breeds 
The Birmingham Roller has both a flying type and a show type. Show Rollers are larger than the flying variety, and are bred just for show. A similar breed called a Parlor Roller look much like Birmingham Rollers, but can't fly; rather, they spin backwards, somersaulting on the ground for many yards. Oriental Rollers are another aerial performer and come in many colour varieties.

See also 
List of pigeon breeds

References

External links
 Birmingham Roller Pigeon Breed Guide - Pigeonpedia
 National Birmingham Roller Club
 Rick Mee's Roller Pigeons

Pigeon breeds
History of Birmingham, West Midlands
Pigeon breeds originating in England